This is a list of poets who have written in the Albanian language.

17th century
 Llukë Bogdani (–1687)
 Nezim Frakulla (1680–1760)
 Muçi Zade (18th Century)

18th century
 Zenel Bastari (18th Century)
 Constantine of Berat (1745–1825)
 Haxhi Ymer Kashari (18th Century)
 Hasan Zyko Kamberi (18th Century)
 Etëhem Bey Mollaj (1783–1846)
 Nasibi Tahir Babai (–1835)
 Sulejman Naibi (–1771)
 Tahir Efendi Jakova (1770–1835)
 Giulio Variboba (1725–1788)
 Demir Vlonjati (1780–1845)

19th century

 Asdreni (1872–1947)
 Thoma Avrami (1869–1943)
 Josif Bageri (1870–1916)
 Çajupi (1866–1930)
 Qamil Çami (1875–1933)
 Spiro Dine (1846–1922)
 Abedin Dino (1843–1906)
 Prend Doçi (1846–1917)
 Gjergj Fishta (1871–1940)
 Dalip Frashëri (19th Century)
 Mid’hat Frashëri (1880–1949)
 Naim Frashëri (1846–1900)
 Shahin Frashëri (19th Century)
 Loni Logori (1871–1929)
 Ndre Mjeda (1866–1937)
 Fan Noli (1882–1965)
 Bernardin Palaj (1894–1947)
 Vaso Pasha (1825–1892)
 Girolamo de Rada (1814–1903)
 Francesco Antonio Santori (1819–1894)
 Giuseppe Schirò (1865–1927)
 Filip Shiroka (1859–1935)
 Kristo Sulidhi (1858–1938)
 Murad Toptani (1867–1918)

20th century

 Dritëro Agolli (1931–2017)
 Mimoza Ahmeti (born 1963)
 Sadri Ahmeti (1939–2010)
 Valdete Antoni (born 1953)
 Fatos Arapi (1930–2018)
 Lindita Arapi (born 1972)
 Besim Bokshi (1930–2014)
 Flora Brovina (born 1949)
 Ibrahim Dalliu (1878–1952)
 Mirko Gashi (1939–1995)
 Ndoc Gjetja (1944–2010)
 Julia Gjika (born 1949)
 Milto S. Gurra (1884–1972)
 Anton Harapi (1888–1946)
 Ervin Hatibi (born 1974)
 Irhan Jubica (born 1973)
 Ismail Kadare (born 1936)
 Karmel Kandreva (1931–1982)
 Veli Karahoda (born 1968)
 Teodor Keko (1958–2002)
 Ernest Koliqi (1903–1975)
 Mark Krasniqi (1920–2015)
 Irma Kurti (born 1966)
 Natasha Lako (born 1948)
 Luljeta Lleshanaku (born 1968)
 Sejfulla Malëshova (1900–1971)
 Migjeni (1911–1938)
 Betim Muço (1947–2015)
 Faruk Myrtaj (born 1955)
 Havzi Nela (1934–1988)
 Dhimitër Pasko (1907–1967)
 Arshi Pipa (1920–1997)
 Lasgush Poradeci (1899–1987)
 Vinçens Prennushi (1885–1949)
 Leon Qafzezi (born 1953)
 Kadrush Radogoshi (born 1948)
 Nijazi Ramadani (born 1964)
 Giuseppe Schirò Di Maggio (born 1944)
 Dhimitër Shuteriqi (1915–2003)
 Drago Siliqi (1930–1963)
 Llazar Siliqi (1924–2001)
 Risto Siliqi (1882–1936)
 Nokë Sinishtaj (born 1944)
 Xhevahir Spahiu (born 1945)
 Iliriana Sulkuqi (born 1951)
 Edi Shukriu (born 1950) 
 Skënder Temali (born 1946)
 Bilal Xhaferri (1935–1986)
 Mihal Zallari (1894–1976)

21st century
 Ndriçim Ademaj (born 1991)
 Mark Lucgjonaj (born 1986)

See also 
 List of Albanian writers

Albanian
Poets

de:Liste albanischer Schriftsteller
pt:Poetas albaneses
sq:Lista e poetëve të njohur shqiptarë